Zhang Zhen (born 1936) was a Chinese diplomat. He was Ambassador of the People's Republic of China to Jordan (1985–1989) and Syria (1989–1993).

References

Ambassadors of China to Jordan
Ambassadors of China to Syria
Living people
1936 births